Kargan is the name of the following villages in Iran:

 Kargan, Ardabil
 Kargan-e Qadim, East Azerbaijan, also known as Kargān
 Kargan, Hormozgan
 Kargan, Kermanshah

See also
 Karkan, Gilan